Princess of the Nile is a 1954 American adventure film directed by Harmon Jones and starring Debra Paget, Jeffrey Hunter and Michael Rennie. It was shot in technicolor and distributed by 20th Century Fox. Originally conceived as a more lavish film, it ended up produced as a second feature.

Plot
Egypt, 1249: The father of Princess Shalimar has fallen under the spell of the sinister Shaman, who drugs him and tries to keep daughter Shalimar a prisoner. She knows a secret passage, however, and slips away at night to entertain the oppressed villagers of Hanwan by disguising herself as Taura, a popular dancer in the Tambourine Tavern.

Prince Haidi, the son of the caliph of Bagdad, rides into town accompanied by Captain Hussein, his close friend. At the same time, the menacing Rama Khan and his powerful army arrive. Rama Khan is conspiring with the Shaman to overthrow the Hanwan rulers.

Hussein is killed by Khan, and in the confusion, Taura the dancing girl stabs Prince Haidi with a dagger, unaware he is a potential ally. Haidi's wounds are not fatal. As he consults Princess Shalimar's father about how to conquer the invading horde, he inquires about the dancer Taura who stabbed him, unaware she and Shalimar are one and the same.

Rama Khan wants the princess for himself. He threatens to kill villagers unless she gives herself to him. A battle ensues, in which Haidi, who now realizes her true identity, overcomes Khan, while the Shaman also endures a well-deserved death.

Cast
 Debra Paget as Princess Shalimar / Taura 
 Jeffrey Hunter as Prince Haidi
 Michael Rennie as Rama Khan
 Dona Drake as Mirva
 Michael Ansara as Captain Kral
 Edgar Barrier as Shaman
 Wally Cassell as Goghi
 Jack Elam as Basra
 Lisa Daniels as Handmaiden
 Phyllis Winger as Handmaiden
 Merry Anders as Handmaiden
 Honey Bruce Harlow as Handmaiden (as Honey Harlow)
 Suzanne Alexander as Handmaiden
 Genice Grayson as Handmaiden
 Cheryll Clarke as Handmaiden
 Kitty London as Handmaiden
 Bobette Bentley as Handmaiden

Production
In January 1953 Fox announced the film would be made in CinemaScope as a vehicle for Marilyn Monroe. They hoped to get Tyrone Power to play the male lead.

References

External links
 
 
 

20th Century Fox films
1954 films
American historical adventure films
1950s historical adventure films
Films directed by Harmon Jones
Films scored by Lionel Newman
Films set in the 13th century
Films set in Egypt
1950s English-language films
1950s American films